Ruhr Nachrichten is a daily newspaper that has been published in Dortmund, Germany since 1949. The paper is published by Medienhaus Lensing in Rheinisch format.

In 2001 Ruhr Nachrichten had a circulation of 225,000 copies.

References

External links
 

1949 establishments in West Germany
German-language newspapers
Mass media in Dortmund
Daily newspapers published in Germany
Newspapers established in 1949